The 44th Regiment Illinois Volunteer Infantry was an infantry regiment that served in the Union Army during the American Civil War.

Service
The 44th  Illinois Infantry was organized at Chicago, Illinois and mustered into Federal service on September 25, 1861.

The regiment was mustered out on November 30, 1865.

Total strength and casualties
The regiment suffered 6 officers and 129 enlisted men who were killed in action or mortally wounded and 1 officer and 156 enlisted men who died of disease, for a total of 292 fatalities.

Commanders
Colonel Charles Knobelsdorff - dismissed due to disability on August 20, 1862.
Colonel Wallace W. Barrett -  mustered out with the regiment.

See also
List of Illinois Civil War Units
Illinois in the American Civil War
15 Letters Written by Germans in the 44th Illinois Infantry

Notes

References
The Civil War Archive

Units and formations of the Union Army from Illinois
1861 establishments in Illinois
Military units and formations established in 1861
Military units and formations disestablished in 1865